Elinton Sanchotene Andrade (born 30 March 1979, Santa Maria, Rio Grande do Sul) is a Brazilian born Portuguese goalkeeper who currently plays for Flamengo Beach Soccer and the Portuguese beach soccer national team.

Personal 
Elinton has a son named Bernardo. He also holds Portuguese citizenship.

Honours

Club
Rapid București
Supercupa României (1): 2007

Marseille
Coupe de la Ligue (2): 2009–10, 2010–11
Ligue 1 (1): 2009–10
Trophée des Champions: 2010

Country
FIFA Beach Soccer World Cup (2): 2015, 2019
Euro Beach Soccer League (3): 2015, 2019, 2020
Euro Beach Soccer Cup (1): 2016

Individual
Euro Beach Soccer League Best Goalkeeper (1): 2015
Euro Beach Soccer Cup Best Goalkeeper (1): 2016
Euro Beach Soccer Cup MVP (1): 2016
Beach Soccer Stars Best Goalkeeper (2): 2016, 2018
FIFA Beach Soccer World Cup Golden Glove (1): 2019

References

External links

romaniansoccer.ro

1979 births
Living people
Sportspeople from Rio Grande do Sul
Portuguese footballers
Portuguese beach soccer players
Beach soccer goalkeepers
Brazilian footballers
Brazilian beach soccer players
Brazilian people of Portuguese descent
Brazilian expatriate footballers
CR Flamengo footballers
Fluminense FC players
CR Vasco da Gama players
Ascoli Calcio 1898 F.C. players
FC Rapid București players
Olympique de Marseille players
Clube Náutico Capibaribe players
Duque de Caxias Futebol Clube players
FC Goa players
Association football goalkeepers
Liga I players
Serie A players
Ligue 1 players
Cypriot First Division players
Expatriate footballers in Italy
Expatriate footballers in Romania
Expatriate footballers in France
Expatriate footballers in India
European Games bronze medalists for Portugal
Beach soccer players at the 2015 European Games
European Games medalists in beach soccer
Beach soccer players at the 2019 European Games
European Games gold medalists for Portugal